"Rollercoaster" is a song performed by Austrian singer-songwriter and radio presenter Julian Le Play. The song was released as a digital download on 4 July 2014 as the third single from his second studio album Melodrom (2014). The song has peaked to number 17 on the Austrian Singles Chart.

Music video
A music video to accompany the release of "Rollercoaster" was first released onto YouTube on 19 June 2014 at a total length of three minutes and fifty-five seconds.

Track listing

Chart performance

Release history

References

2014 songs
2014 singles
Julian Le Play songs